This is a list of public art in Birmingham, in the West Midlands county of England. This list applies only to works of public art accessible in an outdoor public space. For example, this does not include artworks in museums.

Central Birmingham/ Ladywood

City Core

Victoria Square

Chamberlain Square

Bull Ring

Bull Street

Old Square

Steelhouse Conservation Area

Birmingham New Street station

Great Charles Street Queensway

Colmore Row Business Improvement District

Cannon Street

Ethel Street

Westside

Centenary Square

Library of Birmingham

Symphony Hall

Broad Street

ICC Birmingham

Brindleyplace

The Cube

The Mailbox

Ladywood / Five Ways

Five Ways

Ladywood

Highgate

Eastside / Aston University

Digbeth

Southside

Jewellery Quarter

Gun Quarter

Acocks Green

Aston

Newtown

Bartley Green

Billesley

Bordesley Green

Bournville

Castle Vale

Cotteridge

Duddeston

Edgbaston

Cannon Hill Park

Queen Elizabeth Hospital Birmingham

University of Birmingham

Erdington

Garretts Green

Great Barr

Harborne

Hall Green

Handsworth

Hockley

Kings Heath

Kings Norton

Kingstanding

Longbridge

Lozells

Moseley

Nechells

Northfield

Perry Barr

Quinton

Saltley

Selly Oak

Sheldon

Small Heath

South Yardley

Sparkbrook

Sparkhill

Stirchley

Stockland Green

Sutton Coldfield

Winson Green

Yardley Wood

References 

Birmingham
Culture in Birmingham, West Midlands
Public art